Mario Pérez Guadarrama (born 30 December 1946) is a Mexican former professional football defender, who played for the Mexico national team between 1967 and 1973. He was part of the Mexico squad for the 1970 World Cup.

Career
After he retired from playing, Pérez became a football manager. He was appointed manager of Club Necaxa in 1986.

References

External links

 clubamericanista.com.mx
 

1946 births
Living people
Mexico international footballers
Association football defenders
Olympic footballers of Mexico
Footballers at the 1968 Summer Olympics
1970 FIFA World Cup players
Club Necaxa footballers
Club Necaxa managers
Footballers from Mexico City
Liga MX players
Pan American Games medalists in football
Pan American Games gold medalists for Mexico
Mexican footballers
Footballers at the 1967 Pan American Games
Mexican football managers
Medalists at the 1967 Pan American Games